The M-46 Catapult was a self-propelled gun developed in India by Combat Vehicles Research & Development Establishment of the Defence Research & Development Organisation.

Description
The turret-less vehicle has an open area in the centre for the gun and crew but retains the driver's position and includes a horizontal metal shield for overhead protection.

To withstand higher firing stresses and to cater for longer recoil the Vijayanta tank's hull has been elongated with seven bogie wheel stations on either side. The stability to the vehicle during firing is provided by unique hydraulic suspension locking system.
The self-propelled medium artillery gun can fire both HE and AP ammunition and has a maximum range of 27 km. The gun has a limited static traverse 12½% on either side and an elevation of +45% to -2%. The system can stow 30 rounds of separate loading ammunition. Retired in 16 March 2021.

Development
After the 1965 and 1971 wars between India and Pakistan, the Army was in search of mobile (self propelled) artillery gun systems, primarily for the strike formations on the western borders. The production of Catapult guns began in the late 1970s and they were inducted in 1981. The platform is based on the Russian 130 mm M-46 field gun mounted on the lengthened chassis of the ageing British/Indian Vijayanta tank's hull. A total of 100 M-46 Catapult systems were built and are being replaced by an unspecified number and type of 155mm self-propelled howitzers and K-9 Vajra gun systems.

Operational history
The guns never saw combat, though they were deployed during Operation Parakram in 2001 at Samba district of Jammu and Kashmir — in the chicken neck area and Shakargarh bulge and during Operation Zafran after the Pulwama terror attack. It was retired from service in 2021 after 40 years of active service with the Indian Army.

See also
130 mm Catapult on the Arjun Mk 1 chassis

References

Tracked self-propelled howitzers
Self-propelled howitzers of India
Artillery of India
Military vehicles introduced in the 1980s